St. Peter's Evangelical Lutheran Church, or Iglesia Luterana San Pedro, is a historic church complex located in the Walker's Point neighborhood of Milwaukee, Wisconsin. Its buildings are listed on the National Register of Historic Places.

History 
St. Peter's congregation was founded February 14, 1860, by German immigrants, with 34 charter members. In 1861, the congregation bought a frame building for its first church and moved it to the corner of South Eighth and West Scott Streets. In 1866, the congregation built a small brick-clad Gothic-influenced church designed by John Rugee. In 1873, the congregation added the frame parsonage which still survives, and, in 1879, the school building. In 1884, 13 families were released from the congregation to establish Christ Evangelical Lutheran Church. The congregation is affiliated with the Wisconsin Evangelical Lutheran Synod (WELS).

The current church building was designed by Milwaukee architect Andrew Elleson in Victorian Gothic style and built in 1885. The pedimented gables on the larger tower have a German flavor, similar to St. Mary's in Lubeck. The spires on the towers and the peak of the gable are topped with crosses. The interior is well-preserved, with the altar standing in a tall apse, and in front of an antique white wood reredos. To the altar's left is an elevated goblet-shaped pulpit. A U-shaped balcony rings the sides and back of the nave, a common feature of 18th century churches in Germany. A large pipe organ commands the back.

Other remaining structures in the complex are:
 The 1873 parsonage is south of the church - a wood frame building in simplified Italianate style.  It is now used for church offices.
 The 1879 school building stands across the street from the church - a 2-story Italianate-styled brick building designed by architect John Rugee.
 The 1898 social hall designed by O. C. Uehling stands south of the school.

In 1860, the congregation and building rose out of a working-class neighborhood of modest homes of immigrants. The south side is not so different in 1987.

References

External links 
Wisconsin Synod profile
St. Peter's to Celebrate Its 75th Birthday.  Wisconsin Historical Society.
Memoirs of Milwaukee County-Church History
American Lutheran Biographies (Rev. Reinhold Adelberg)
Aged Pastor (Adelberg) Retires.  Milwaukee Journal, October 7, 1895.
Clergy Honors Pastor. Milwaukee Journal, September 11, 1911.
1862: The Beginning of Eleven Years of Trouble at St. Peter's
Growing Pains in two South-Side Congregations: St. Peter's Ev. Lutheran Church & Christ Ev. Lutheran Church
1960-2010: Fifty Years Under God's Protection
Rev. William Dammann: Seelsorger through Storm and Stress
Paul Pieper: A True Son of His Father
Wisconsin Historical Society Property Records
National Register of Historic Places Registration Form (1987)

Churches on the National Register of Historic Places in Wisconsin
Churches in Milwaukee
German-American culture in Milwaukee
Lutheran churches in Wisconsin
Italianate architecture in Wisconsin
Churches completed in 1885
19th-century Lutheran churches in the United States
National Register of Historic Places in Milwaukee
Wisconsin Evangelical Lutheran Synod churches
Italianate church buildings in the United States